James Shields (April 13, 1762August 13, 1831) was a one-term U.S. Representative from Ohio, serving from 1829 to 1831.

Biography

A descendant of the Ó Siadhail family, Shields was born in Banbridge, County Down in the Kingdom of Ireland.

He received a good common-school education, entering the University of Glasgow, Scotland in 1782 and graduated in 1786. He attended medical college for two years, before emigrating to the United States in July 1791 and settled in Frederick County, Virginia, where he taught school. He moved to Butler County, Ohio in 1801, but then returned to Virginia and became a citizen of the United States in 1804.

Political career 
He returned to Ohio in 1807 and was a member of the Ohio House of Representatives between 1806 and 1827 and was an elector for Andrew Jackson in 1828. He was elected as a Jacksonian to the 21st United States Congress (March 4, 1829 – March 3, 1831).

Death
Shields was killed through the accidental overturning of a stagecoach near Venice, Butler County, Ohio on August 13, 1831. He was interred in Venice Cemetery, Venice, Ohio. He was the uncle of U.S. Senator James Shields.

References

1762 births
1831 deaths
18th-century Irish people
19th-century Irish people
Alumni of the University of Glasgow
Irish emigrants to the United States (before 1923)
Jacksonian members of the United States House of Representatives from Ohio
19th-century American politicians
Members of the Ohio House of Representatives
People from Banbridge
People from Butler County, Ohio
Politicians from County Down
Road incident deaths in Ohio
1828 United States presidential electors